Týniště is a municipality and village in Plzeň-South District in the Plzeň Region of the Czech Republic. It has about 50 inhabitants.

Geography
It lies in the Švihov Highlands. The Zlatý Brook springs here and flows across the municipality.

History
The first written mention of Týniště is from 1379, under its former name Pustá. The name Týniště was first documented in 1542.

From 1961 to 1990, Týniště was administrative part of Horšice. Since 1 September 1990, the municipality has been separate again.

Transport
Týniště is located on the regional route II/230, section Nepomuk–Přeštice.

References

External links

Villages in Plzeň-South District